Gull Harbor may refer to:

Gull Harbor (New Bern, North Carolina), a historic house
Gull Harbor (Washington), a bay